The 11th Saturn Awards, honoring the best in science fiction, fantasy and horror film in 1983, were held on March 24, 1984.

Winners and nominees
Below is a complete list of nominees and winners. Winners are highlighted in bold.

Film awards

Special awards

George Pal Memorial Award
 Nicholas Meyer

President's Award
 Roger Corman

References

External links
 The Official Saturn Awards Site

Saturn Awards ceremonies
Saturn
Saturn